The Carl S. English Jr. Botanical Gardens (7 acres) are botanical gardens located on the grounds of the Hiram M. Chittenden Locks at 3015 NW 54th Street, Seattle, Washington.

History 
After the locks were built in 1911, landscape architect Carl English of the United States Army Corps of Engineers transformed the construction site into garden in an English landscape style. All told, he spent 43 years planting and tending the gardens.

Plant collections 
The gardens contain more than 500 species and 1,500 varieties of plants from around the world, including fan palms, oaks, Mexican pines, rhododendrons, and a fine display of roses. The gardens also exhibit an extensive fuchsia display and a special section for lilies in season.

See also
 List of botanical gardens in the United States

References

External links

Ballard, Seattle
English
Parks in Seattle